The 1999 Toyota Grand Prix of Long Beach was the third round of the 1999 CART FedEx Champ Car World Series season, held on April 18, 1999, on the streets of Long Beach, California.

This marks the first Long Beach Grand Prix without former Long Beach winners Bobby Rahal and Al Unser Jr. Rahal retired at the end of 1998, and Al Unser was injured in the inaugural race of the season.

Report

Race 
In qualifying, Tony Kanaan, the Rookie of the Year in 1998, took his first CART career pole after a close battle with Dario Franchitti. At the start, it was Bryan Herta who took the lead after passing both Kanaan and Franchitti at the first corner, but that did not last long, as both Kanaan and Franchitti passed Herta on the second lap. The duo pulled away and built a gap, whereas Herta was passed later in the stint by Juan Pablo Montoya. Montoya was running very quickly, and passed Franchitti at a restart later on and put pressure on Kanaan. As the laps went by, it was clear that Montoya was faster, and that Kanaan was under increasing pressure. On lap 46, the pressure told, as Kanaan made a mistake and crashed at Turn 6. Montoya took the lead and dominated the rest of the race to take his first career win ahead of Franchitti and Herta.

Classification

Race

Caution flags

Lap leaders

Point standings after race

References

Toyota Grand Prix of Long Beach